Horinger (Mongolian:    Қорин Гэр сиыан Qorin Ger siyan) is a county of Inner Mongolia Autonomous Region, North China, it is under the administration of the prefecture-level city of Hohhot, the capital of Inner Mongolia, bordering Shanxi province to the southeast.

History
The site of Shengle to the northwest of the present-day county seat of Horinger was the capital of the Xianbei Kingdom of Dai during the Sixteen Kingdoms Period of Chinese history.

Climate

Transport
China National Highway 209
Inner Mongolia Provincial Highway 210
Fengzhun Railway
Hohhot Shengle International Airport

Economy
GDP: RMB ￥7.82 billion in 2006
Pillar industries: milk industry, wool industry, forestry, lamb and beef industry
Mengniu, the biggest manufacturer of dairy products in China, is based in Horinger.

Education
At year-end of 2006, there are 46 primary and secondary schools and 4 kindergartens  in the city.
Number of students enrolled at year-end of 2006: 655 in kindergartens, 10962 in primary schools, 10241 in junior high schools, 4417 in senior high schools.
Number of teachers at year-end of 2006: 1834 full-time teachers and staff
Percentage of children of the right age attending primary school in 2006: 100%
Percentage of primary school graduates entering a higher school in 2006: 100%
Percentage of junior high graduates entering a higher school in 2006: 83.59%

Health
Number of medical entities at year-end of 2005: 14
Number of health-care entities at year-end of 2005: 1
Number of hospital beds at year-end of 2005: 178
Number of medical doctors, registered nurses and medical technicians at year end of 2005: 230

External links
Official site of Huhhot
Horinger

References

County-level divisions of Inner Mongolia